Aparhant is a village in Tolna County, Hungary.

A little village in suburban Hungary, surrounded with breathtaking countryside. It has lovely views of hills and forests in the not so distant Mecsek. 
The chief occupations are agriculture and horticulture. 
The education system provides only primary educations, with village inhabitants needing to travel further out for a secondary education.

The population is around 1200 people.
It is known as the highest internet users in the country per capita.

External links 
 Street map 

Populated places in Tolna County